The Descent from the Cross is a 1650–1652 painting of the Descent from the Cross by an unknown painter in the workshop of Rembrandt. It is an oil painting on canvas and is now in the National Gallery of Art in Washington.

Rembrandt's student Constantijn van Renesse has been proposed as the painter. The picture's composition would have been conceived by Rembrandt, who may have drawn it onto the canvas for van Renesse to complete, as the finished work does not show Rembrandt's touch.

See also
 The Descent from the Cross (Rembrandt, 1634)

References

1650s paintings
Paintings by Rembrandt
Collections of the National Gallery of Art
Rembrandt, 1650-52